Émile D'Hooge (born 4 August 1908, date of death unknown) was a Belgian water polo player. He competed in the men's tournament at the 1948 Summer Olympics.

References

1908 births
Year of death missing
Belgian male water polo players
Olympic water polo players of Belgium
Water polo players at the 1948 Summer Olympics
Sportspeople from Ghent